Nusym Technology, Inc. was a company that produced intelligent verification software products, also known as intelligent testbench products, which are a form of functional verification that targets and maximizes test coverage of a logic design by automatically adapting the verification testbenches to changes in register transfer level code.

History
The company was founded in 2004 by Chris Wilson, Ken Imboden and Dave Gold. The company had offices in California and Bangalore.

It was acquired by Synopsys on June 28, 2010.

References

Electronic design automation companies
Companies based in Silicon Valley
Software companies established in 2004